The 2017 Asian Road Cycling Championships were held in Manama, Bahrain from 25 February to 2 March 2017.

Medal summary

Men

Women

Medal table

References

External links
Official website
Results

Asian Cycling Championships
Asia
Cycling Championships
Asian Cycling Championships
International sports competitions hosted by Bahrain
February 2017 sports events in Asia
March 2017 sports events in Asia
21st century in Manama
Sport in Manama